Afternoon of the Elves is a 1989 children's novel by author Janet Taylor Lisle. Afternoon of the Elves was a Newbery Medal Honor Book in 1990.

References

External links 
 Afternoon of the Elves on Open Library

1989 American novels
Newbery Honor-winning works
American young adult novels
1989 children's books
Orchard Books books